The Institute of Accounting Technicians (Canada) is a not-for-profit professional body for those working as accounting technicians and in accounting fields.  

The Institute’s educational program is recognized for exemptions by:

Association of Accounting Technicians (AAT)
Association of Chartered Certified Accountants (ACCA)
Chartered Institute of Management Accountants  (CIMA)

References

External links
 The Institute of Accounting Technicians – Official website

Professional accounting bodies